Prince Albert East was a constituency of the Legislative Assembly of Saskatchewan. It was represented by Mike Feschuk from 1971 to 1975.

References 

Former provincial electoral districts of Saskatchewan